Donald Hough (June 29, 1895 – c. 1965) was an American humorist and writer of several books and film scripts. He was born in St. Paul Minnesota June 29, 1895, and died around 1965. He was the son of Mr. & Mrs. Sherwood Hough. His wife's name was Berry; they had one son named Sherwood.

According to the dust jacket notes on a first-edition copy of Snow Above Town (W.W. Norton, 1943), Hough's career included:

 Working as a reporter for various St. Paul newspapers "for about five years"
 Writing for several outdoor magazines
 At various times between 1924 and 1936, serving as publicity director for the Izaak Walton League
 Proprietorship of an advertising agency in Chicago, Illinois
 "Devising the application" of the first soundproofing for airplanes and assisting in its application to the first China Clipper
 Invention of a type of outdoor clothing considered for purchase by the Russian army
 Service as a forest ranger
 During World War II, serving as a captain in the U.S. Army Air Force

Those dust jacket notes quote Hough as saying he began writing for Colliers and The Saturday Evening Post in the 1930s "to get my crack at the movies." It was in the course of moving his family to Hollywood, via Mexico City, that Hough passed through Jackson Hole, Wyoming, found himself without sufficient funds to carry through on his planned move, and settled briefly. While in Jackson Hole he pursued his writing for Colliers, inventing the characters of Hade and Steve, based on individuals he had met in the area. Hal Roach made some of those stories into the films listed below.

Among the people he encountered, at least by reputation, in Jackson Hole was publishing heiress and philanthropist Cissy Patterson. Various anecdotes about her are recounted in the Cocktail Hour in Jackson Hole.

Books
The Streetcar House (1960)
the Cocktail Hour in Jackson Hole (1956) (initial capital recorded here as originally published)
The Camelephamoose (August 1946)
Darling, I Am Home (1946)
Big Distance (with Elliott Arnold, 1945)
Captain Retread (1944)
Snow Above Town (1943)

Film scripts
Prairie Chickens (1943)
Calaboose (1943)
Dudes Are Pretty People (1942)

The three items above were Hal Roach "streamliners," films of about 45 minutes length—between a short and a feature.

Hough also wrote the teleplay, A Place of His Own (1952) for television's Four Star Playhouse.  (Filmography Source)

1895 births
1960s deaths
American male novelists
American male screenwriters
20th-century American novelists
20th-century American male writers
20th-century American screenwriters